The Forward Gal Stakes is a Grade III American Thoroughbred horse race for three-year-old fillies, over a distance of seven furlongs on the dirt held annually in late January or early February at Gulfstream Park in Hallandale Beach, Florida.  The event currently carries a purse of $125,000.

History

The race is named for Forward Gal, the American Champion Two-Year-Old Filly of 1970 and a career winner of twelve events in 26 starts.

The inaugural running of the event was on 12 February 1981 and was won by Hickory Tree Stable's Dame Mysterieuse by  lengths in a time of 1:22. Dame Mysterieuse starting as the 8/5 favorite was ridden by French-born jockey Jean-Luc Samyn and was trained by Hall of Fame trainer Woody Stephens. Woody Stephens also trained the second placegetter Heavenly Cause and the fourth place finisher Del La Rose in the race.

The following year, 1982, the event was run in split divisions.

The 1984 winner Miss Oceana began her three-year-old career in the event after winning three Grade I events as a two-year-old. Starting at short odds of 2/5on Miss Oceana breezed winning the race by three lengths in a time of 1:22 providing Woody Stephens with his third winner after only four runnings of the event.

The event was upgraded in 1986 by the American Graded Stakes Committee to Grade III race.

In the 1989 the event was won by Eugene V. Klein's Open Mind, the Breeders' Cup Juvenile Fillies winner from the year before and US Champion Two-Year-Old Filly. Trained by US Hall of Fame trainer D. Wayne Lukas and ridden by US Hall of Fame jockey Angel Cordero Jr., Open Mind won by two lengths, winning her third straight event. Open Mind would win seven more straight events including five Grade I events to be voted US Champion Three-Year-Old Filly for 1989.

The event was upgraded to Grade II classification in 1991 and was downgraded back to Grade III in 1997. In 1997, the 17th running of the event H. Joseph Allen's Glitter Woman ridden by US Hall of Fame jockey Mike E. Smith blitzed her rivals winning by a then record  lengths victory and setting a new stakes record time for the event in 1.21.76. The record stands to date, however the 2012 winner Broadway's Alibi created a new winning margin record thrashing her rivals by  lengths.

In 2004 the event was upgraded once again to Grade II and held the classification for fourteen runnings until 2017 when it was downgraded back to Grade III.

The event carries qualification points to the Kentucky Oaks as part of the Road to the Kentucky Oaks.

Records
Speed record:  
 1:21.76 – Glitter Woman   (1997)

Margins:
 lengths – Broadway's Alibi  (2012)

Most wins by an owner:
 2 – Hickory Tree Stable (1981, 1982)
 2 – Edward P. Evans (1991, 2001)

Most wins by a jockey:
 4 – Luis Saez (2017, 2021, 2022, 2023)

Most wins by a trainer:
 4 – Todd A. Pletcher (2012, 2013, 2014, 2021)

Winners

See also
List of American and Canadian Graded races
Forward Gal Stakes top three finishers
Road to the Kentucky Oaks

External links
 2021–22 Gulfstream Park Media Guide

References

1981 establishments in Florida
Horse races in Florida
Gulfstream Park
Flat horse races for three-year-old fillies
Graded stakes races in the United States
Recurring sporting events established in 1981
Grade 3 stakes races in the United States